Gopika Anil (born 27 April 1994) is an Indian actress who primarily works in Malayalam films and television. She is well known for her role as Anjali in the soap opera,  Santhwanam.

Filmography

Films

Television

Webseries

Music album
 Muripala Gopala
 അമ്മേ കൈതൊഴാം 
 താമരക്കണ്ണൻ 
 തായേ ഭഗവതി 
 മുത്തപ്പനൊരു മണിമാല
 ചിരി തൂകി കളിയാടി വാ വാ കണ്ണാ 
 ജയദുർഗ്ഗ

References

External links
Gopika Anil

Living people
21st-century Indian actresses
Indian film actresses
Actresses from Kozhikode
Actresses in Malayalam cinema
Actresses in Malayalam television
Indian television actresses
Child actresses in Malayalam cinema
Indian child actresses
1995 births